XHUA-FM is a radio station located in Chihuahua City, Chihuahua. It transmits on 90.1 FM with 19,640 watts of power.  The current format is known as Love FM.

History
XHUA received its concession on November 28, 1988. It was owned by Radiorama subsidiary Audio Cultura, S.A.

In June 2016, Radiorama's XHUA and Grupo BM Radio's XHHES-FM switched formats, with Estéreo Vida moving to 94.1 and Estéreo Sensación to 90.1. Soon after, XHUA became romantic Love FM when operation of the station shifted to Grupo Audiorama, a related company.

External links
 Radio Locator information for XHUA-FM

References

Radio stations in Chihuahua
Mass media in Chihuahua City